Titan Airways is a British charter airline founded in 1988 and based at London Stansted Airport. The carrier specialises in short-notice ACMI (aircraft, crew, maintenance, and insurance) and wet lease operations as well as ad-hoc passenger and cargo charter services to tour operators, corporations, governments and the sports and entertainment sectors. The company holds a United Kingdom Civil Aviation Authority Type A Operating Licence, permitting it to carry passengers, cargo and mail on aircraft with 20 or more seats.

History 

Founded in 1988 as a subsidiary of the Artac Freight and Shipping Group, Titan Airways was named after its first aircraft type, a Cessna 404 Titan, however, the airline's logo draws reference to Titan, a moon of Saturn. Their Cessna 404 aircraft were mainly used to carry car parts between various Ford/General Motors facilities in the UK and Europe, but it was also available for ad hoc freight charters and ultimately passenger charters. By 1993, the fleet had grown to include an Embraer Emb 110 Bandeirante, two Short SD 330s and three SD 360s.

The airline's success attracted investment group 3i which took a stake in the company in 1995. Two ATR 42s were also added before the first jet – a BAe 146-200QC – was acquired in 1996. This was the first containerised jet used by the Royal Mail, but it also operated many passenger charter flights and airline sub-services. As the Mail contract grew in size, the first of five Boeing 737-300s was introduced in 1999.

The airline has been consistently profitable, turning a profit in 24 of its 27-year history and has ranked in the Sunday Times Profit Track 100 league table on four occasions since the year 2000. In the early 2000s (decade) Titan Airways found an additional niche in the market, pioneering a rapid response Go Now sub-charter service for airlines experiencing operational problems. The innovative concept earned the company Queen's Award for Enterprise in 2001.

Demand by customer airlines for more seats and greater range led to the acquisition of two 757-200s in 2003 and 2005, with one aircraft having a VIP interior for corporate use. In 2006 Titan achieved ETOPS rating for the aircraft, enabling long haul charters to the US and Middle East. The largest aircraft in the Titan family, a 265-seat B767-300, joined the fleet in 2009, and the smallest, a new Cessna Citation CJ2+ arrived in December 2011.

In 2012 Titan became an independent company, following a management buyout that left Gene Willson, Managing Director and one of the original founders, as the sole share holder.

Titan added its first Airbus aircraft, an Airbus A320, to its fleet in early Spring 2013. This addition was the first step in its long-term fleet strategy which will see Titan's current fleet of Boeing aircraft gradually being replaced by Airbus aircraft over the next five to six years. Two additional A320s joined the fleet in early 2015.

September 2015 saw Titan announce plans to add an Airbus A319 and Airbus A321 to the fleet before the start of summer 2016 and that they were considering adding the smallest member of the Airbus A320 family, an Airbus A318, to their fleet.

Operations

Airline sub-charter and lease
Titan Airways provides short, medium or long term wet and damp lease operations worldwide to third party carriers. 
The UK carrier also operates short notice sub-charter services, with the ability to launch aircraft within 60 minutes when airline customers experience unexpected operational problems.

Tour operator flight series
Titan Airways operates charter flights on a seasonal basis to a number of destinations on behalf of UK-based tour operators and cruise companies. Longstanding tour operator partnerships include regular operations from UK airports to Calvi in Corsica, Lourdes and Chambéry in France, Turin in Italy, Dalaman in Turkey, Preveza in Greece and Banjul in the Gambia.

Ad hoc charter
Aside from these regular seasonal routes, Titan Airways operates long and short haul flights on an ad hoc basis on behalf of individuals, blue chip companies, Premier League football teams, high-profile personalities and pop/rock groups.   In September 2021, after a 19 months hiatus in filming due to the COVID-19 pandemic,  season 33 of the USA TV series "The Amazing Race" resumed.  For the safety of the racers and the crew, instead of going back to taking commercial flights as they had done in the past, they used  a Titan Airways Boeing 757 with an "Amazing Race" livery.

Corporate events 
Titan Airways sometimes uses their aircraft in product launches, trade shows, promotional events and hospitality trips for other companies.

Royal Mail
Titan Airways’ cooperation with the Royal Mail dates back to the early 1990s when operations began with the carrier's Short 360 and ATR 42 aircraft. In 1996 the carrier's BAe 146-200 fleet superseded the smaller aircraft before being joined, and ultimately replaced, by Titan's Boeing 737-300QCs. The aircraft operated on behalf of the Royal Mail with nightly flights from Stansted to Edinburgh and to Belfast.

Government
Titan Airways carries out flights for Home Office and the Foreign Office of the Government of the United Kingdom.

On 30 July 2020, Titan Airways' Boeing 757 became the largest passenger aircraft to land and depart from Saint Helena Airport. This flight was a repatriation mission on behalf of the British Government. A series of flights to Saint Helena and Ascension Island, once per month during the rest of 2020 and 2021, were performed with the same aircraft type. On 11 January 2021, one of Titan's Boeing 757 aircraft delivered 100 coronavirus vaccines to Saint Helena.

Military
Titan Airways' Boeing 767 operated to the Falkland Islands on behalf of the UK Ministry of Defence for two years until September 2012, with twice-weekly flights departing from RAF Brize Norton, in Oxfordshire, to RAF Mount Pleasant via RAF Ascension Island. In 2014 Titan Airways' RJ100 aircraft had been based in Sharjah on contract to the UK MoD since 2011. The RJ100 superseded Titan Airways' BAe 146 operations in the Persian Gulf region which dated back to 2009.

Geodis Air Network 

In 2021, following significant air-freight capacity shortages due to the COVID19 pandemic, Geodis Air Network leased an Airbus A330-300 converted freighter from JP Lease. The aircraft is operated by Titan Airways and is registered G-EODS. It is to fly between Amsterdam, London, Chicago and Hong Kong.

Fleet

Current fleet 

As of November 2022, the Titan Airways fleet consists of the following aircraft:

Former fleet

Accidents and incidents
On February 26, 2020 a Titan Airways Airbus A321-211 suffered an engine surge immediately after takeoff from Gatwick Airport. Shortly after the other engine stalled. The aircraft landed safely at Gatwick eleven minutes after takeoff. The Air Accidents Investigation Branch determined fuel contamination following defective maintenance undetected for two days had caused the incident. Safety recommendations were made to the European Union Aviation Safety Agency, and changes made by organisations including Airbus and the International Air Transport Association.

References

Bibliography
 Eastwood, Tony and Roach, John. Turbo Prop Airliner Production List. The Aviation Hobby Shop, 1998, .

External links

 

Charter airlines of the United Kingdom
Airlines established in 1988
3i Group companies
1988 establishments in England
British companies established in 1988
Companies based in Essex